Zeng Qiliang (born May 10, 1975) is a retired male breaststroke swimmer from PR China. He represented his native country at the 1996 Summer Olympics in Atlanta, Georgia. Zeng won the silver medal in the men's 100m breaststroke event at the 1998 World Aquatics Championships in Perth, Australia., which is the first medal of Chinese male swimmer in world championships.

External links

1975 births
Living people
Chinese male breaststroke swimmers
Olympic swimmers of China
Swimmers at the 1996 Summer Olympics
World Aquatics Championships medalists in swimming
Asian Games medalists in swimming
Swimmers at the 1998 Asian Games
Swimmers at the 2002 Asian Games
Asian Games gold medalists for China
Asian Games silver medalists for China
Medalists at the 1998 Asian Games
Medalists at the 2002 Asian Games
20th-century Chinese people
21st-century Chinese people